This is a family tree of the Habsburg family. This family tree only includes male scions of the House of Habsburg from 1096 to 1564. Otto II was the first to take the Habsburg Castle name as his own, adding "von Habsburg" to his title and creating the House of Habsburg.

Ancestors of the Habsburgs 

Fragmentary references (see below) cite the Habsburgs as descendants of the early Germanic Etichonider, probably of Frankish, Burgundian or Visigothic origin, who ruled the Duchy of Alsace in the Early Middle Ages (7th–10th centuries). The dynasty is named for Eticho (also known as Aldarich) who ruled from 662 to 690.

Early Habsburgs 
Family tree of the ancestors of the Habsburg family, largely before becoming Holy Roman Emperors and (Arch)Dukes of Austria. This family tree only includes male scions of the House of Habsburg from 920 to 1308. Otto II was probably the first to take the Habsburg Castle name as his own, adding "von Habsburg" to his title and creating the House of Habsburg. See below for more references.

Middle Habsburgs

Later Habsburgs 
Similarly, this family tree only includes male scions of the House of Habsburg-Lorraine who survived to adulthood:

References

See also
 List of rulers of Austria

Family trees